Sonarchar Wildlife Sanctuary is a wildlife sanctuary located near Rangabali Upazila at Patuakhali District of Bangladesh. It was officially declared as a wildlife sanctuary by the government of Bangladesh on 24 December 2011.

It is one of the safe zones for vultures as per the Vulture Safe Zone-2 Schedule of the government of Bangladesh in 2012.

See also
 List of wildlife sanctuaries of Bangladesh

References 

Wildlife sanctuaries of Bangladesh